Six Royal Navy ships have been called HMS Hero:

 , a 74-gun third rate launched in 1759, a prison ship after 1793, renamed Rochester in 1800, and broken up 1810
 , a 74-gun third rate launched in 1803 and wrecked on 25 December 1811, with the loss of all her crew, inside the northern Haaks about five or six miles from the Texel
 , a 74-gun third rate launched in September 1816, renamed Wellington in December, becoming the training ship Akbar in 1862 and broken up 1908
 , a screw-propelled 91-gun second rate, launched in 1858 and sold 1871. This was the vessel in which the Prince of Wales (later King Edward VII) sailed on his tour of Canada and the United States in 1860
 , a  turret ship launched in 1885 and sunk as a target in 1908
 , an H-class destroyer launched in 1936 and transferred to Canada as HMCS Chaudiere in 1943, broken up 1946

See also 
 Hero (pinnace), a steam-powered boat
 There were also at least three hired armed vessels that bore the name Hero. There were two cutters and one lugger.
 The 1970s BBC television drama series Warship was set aboard a fictional Royal Navy , HMS Hero.

References

 
 

Royal Navy ship names